The Federal Correctional Institution, Otisville (FCI Otisville) is a medium-security United States federal prison for male inmates located near Otisville, New York. It is operated by the Federal Bureau of Prisons (BOP), a division of the United States Department of Justice. It also includes a satellite prison camp for minimum-security male offenders. It is known for its relatively high number of Jewish inmates.

Location

Jewish demographics
Aleph Institute's prison outreach director, Rabbi Menachem Katz, stated that the BOP "kind of unofficially designated it to meet the needs of Orthodox Jews" due to the proximity to the Jewish population of New York City. Circa 2008 the warden of the prison stated 58 prisoners were Jewish, while Jewish Prisoner Services International chairman Gary Friedman stated that about 120 prisoners were Jewish. FCI Otisville offers Passover Seders, done in the prison cafeteria. Until other prisons began offering seders, prisoners at those institutions took buses to Otisville to partake in seders. Peter Hyman of New York magazine wrote "Otisville still offers one of the more traditional Seders in the prison system." Religious Jewish inmates request assignment to FCI Otisville for these reasons.

Notable incidents
On August 11, 2009, former correction officer Hope Spinato (assigned to FCI Otisville) was sentenced to eight months in prison after pleading guilty to aiding and assisting an inmate serving a 17-year drug trafficking sentence, in briefly escaping the facility. An investigation by the Federal Bureau of Investigation found that Spinato became involved in a relationship with the inmate (not identified by the Bureau of Prisons) and drove the inmate between the facility and her home, on several occasions.

In popular culture
George Jung, the basis for the 2001 film Blow, served time at FCI Otisville, but was later transferred to the Federal Correctional Institution in Fort Dix, New Jersey, before being released in 2017.

In the Spike Lee film 25th Hour, the protagonist Montgomery "Monty" Brogan spends his final day commiserating with friends and family before reporting to Otisville for a seven-year sentence.

In the opening of the 2010, film Wall Street: Money Never Sleeps, the sequel to the 1987 film Wall Street, Gordon Gekko, played by Michael Douglas, is released after serving an eight-year sentence for insider trading and securities fraud for his actions as a corporate raider in the first movie. Although the scene was actually shot at Sing Sing state prison, Gekko mentions in the film that he served his sentence at FCI Otisville.

In The Mindy Project, nurse Morgan refers to his time in Otisville for the theft of cars with his cousin.

In 2019, Mike "The Situation" Sorrentino, who is famous from the MTV show Jersey Shore, was sentenced to 8 months for tax fraud.

In Season 3 Episode 4 of Succession, Tom Wambsgans mentions Otisville as "the Jewish jail" while looking through a list of prisons where he will potentially be incarcerated.

Notable inmates (current and former)

Current

Former

See also

 List of United States federal prisons
 Federal Bureau of Prisons
 Incarceration in the United States

References

External links
 Federal Bureau of Prisons: FCI Otisville
 

1977 establishments in New York (state)
Buildings of the United States government in New York (state)
Buildings and structures in Orange County, New York
Federal Correctional Institutions in the United States
Economy of Orange County, New York
Otisville, New York
Prisons in New York (state)